Epaphroditinae is a subfamily of praying mantids in the Epaphroditidae: previously placed in the family Hymenopodidae and now containing two monotypic tribes.  The type genus remains Epaphrodita (Serville, 1831).

Tribes and Genera 
tribe Callimantini
 Callimantis Stal, 1877 - monotypic (C. antillarum Saussure, 1859)
tribe Epaphroditini
 Epaphrodita Serville, 1831
now placed elsewhere
Amphecostephanus (Rehn, 1912) is now placed in the Chroicopteridae: Chroicopterinae
Parablepharis (Saussure, 1870) is now placed in the Hymenopodidae: Phyllothelyinae
Phyllocrania (Burmeister, 1838) is now placed in the Hymenopodidae: Phyllocraniinae

References

Mantodea
Mantodea subfamilies